Nardin Rural District is a rural district (dehestan) in Kalpush District, Meyami County, Semnan Province, Iran. At the 2006 census, its population was 5,514, in 1,457 families.  The rural district has 4 villages.

References 

Rural Districts of Semnan Province
Meyami County